Jiggs Whigham (born Oliver Haydn Whigham III; August 20, 1943) is an American jazz trombonist.

Biography

Born in Cleveland, Ohio, United States, he began his professional career at the age of 17, joining the Glenn Miller/Ray McKinley orchestra in 1961.  He left that band for Stan Kenton, where he played in the touring "mellophonium" band in 1963, then settled in New York City to play commercially.

Frustrated with commercial playing, Whigham migrated to Germany, where he still lives.  He taught at the Hochschule für Musik in Berlin.  He played for many years in the big band of Kurt Edelhagen, was a featured soloist in the Bert Kaempfert orchestra, and was also a member of the Peter Herbolzheimer band. He is widely admired by trombonists and other musicians for his fluent and expressive playing, and has produced an extensive discography as a leader, including work with Bill Holman, Niels-Henning Ørsted Pedersen, Carl Fontana, and many others.

In more recent years, Whigham has been musical director of the RIAS Big Band in Berlin, Germany. He is formerly conductor of the BBC Big Band in Great Britain and currently co-director of the Berlin Jazz Orchestra with singer Marc Secara. He is featured on the Berlin Jazz Orchestra albums Update, You're Everything, Songs of Berlin and music DVD (Polydor/Universal) Strangers In Night - The Music Of Bert Kaempfert.  He was visiting tutor and artist at the Guildhall School of Music and Drama in London, the Royal Northern College of Music in Manchester and KUG in Graz, Austria.  He is artist-in-residence for the Conn-Selmer company, maker of the King Jiggs Whigham model trombone. He continues to tour worldwide as soloist, conductor, and educator.  Since 2008 he has been a regular musical director for the Bundesjazzorchester working with the top student jazz musicians in Germany.

He makes his home in Bonn-Bad Godesberg, Germany and Cape Cod, Massachusetts.

Discography
 Values (MPS, 1971)
 The Jiggs Up (Capri, 1988)
 First Take (Mons, 1994)
 Hope (Mons, 1995)
 Jiggs & Gene (Azica, 1996)
 Blue Highway: The Music of Paul Ferguson (Azica, 1998)
 Jazz Meets Band (1999)
 The Heart & Soul of Hoagy Carmichael (TNC Jazz, 2002)
 Two-Too (Summit, 2006)
 Live at Nighttown: Not So Standards (Azica, 2015)

With the Berlin Jazz Orchestra
 2004 Update 
 2007 You're Everything 
 2012 Strangers In Night - The Music Of Bert Kaempfert DVD
 2021 Songs of Berlin
 2022 Crosscurrents

With the hr-Bigband 
 Strangers in the Night: The Music of Bert Kaempfert (Polydor, 2006)

As sideman
With Carl Fontana
 1999 Nice 'n' Easy
 2002 Keepin' up with the Boneses

With Peter Herbolzheimer
 1973 Wide Open
 2005 Toots Suite
 2006 Getting Down to Brass Tracks

With Stan Kenton
 1964 Artistry in Voices and Brass
 1964 Stan Kenton presents Jean Turner
 1998 Concert in England
 2000 Live at Newport: 1959, 1963, 1971
 2001 Back to Balboa: Tribute to Stan Keaton, Vol. 6
 2003 At Brant Inn 1963

With Kenton Alumni Band
 1992 50th Anniversary Celebration: The Best of Back to Balboa
 1995 50th Anniversary Celebration: Back to Balboa
 1995  'Round Midnight Concert, Shades of Kenton Jazz Orchestra

With Paul Kuhn
 2008 As Time Goes By
 2013 Swing 85

With Bud Shank
 1992 The Awakening
 1995 Lost Cathedral

With others
 1969 Harpadelic, Johnny Teupen
 1970 Globe Unity 67 & 70, Globe Unity Orchestra
 1971 Homecoming, Art Farmer
 1972 ...Und..., Mladen Gutesha
 1976 Kaempfert '76, Bert Kaempfert
 1984 Lightnin' , Klaus Weiss Big Band
 1988 Barlach Zyklus, Mikesch Van Grummer
 1992 Joe Pass in Hamburg, Joe Pass
 1998 Meets the RIAS Big Band, Allen Farnham
 2000 North Sea Jazz Sessions, Volume 2, Frank Rosolino
 2005 Mosaic Select: Johnny Richards, Johnny Richards
 2006 Tea Break/Back Again/Jazz from Two Sides, Vic Lewis
 2007 Evergreens, Kurt Edelhagen
 2007 Turnstile: The Music of the Trumpet Kings, Harry Allen

References

External links 
  
 Jiggs Whigham at AllMusic
 RIAS Tribute to Stan Kenton on Youtube from a broadcast in Germany

1943 births
Living people
Musicians from Cleveland
American jazz trombonists
Male trombonists
Pausa Records artists
Jazz musicians from Ohio
21st-century trombonists
21st-century American male musicians
Academic staff of the Hochschule für Musik Hanns Eisler Berlin
American male jazz musicians
Berlin Jazz Orchestra members
Summit Records artists